In mathematics, the Lévy–Steinitz theorem identifies the set of values to which rearrangements of an infinite series of vectors in Rn can converge. It was proved by Paul Lévy in his first published paper when he was 19 years old. In 1913 Ernst Steinitz filled in a gap in Lévy's proof and also proved the result by a different method.

In an expository article, Peter Rosenthal stated the theorem in the following way.

 The set of all sums of rearrangements of a given series of vectors in a finite-dimensional real Euclidean space is either the empty set or a translate of a subspace (i.e., a set of the form v + M, where v is a given vector and M is a linear subspace).

See also
Riemann series theorem

References 

Mathematical series
Permutations
Summability theory
Theorems in analysis